Marija Jovanovich is an Australian military test pilot and the RAAF's most senior female pilot. Jovanovich has over 3,300 hours of flight experience, in over 30 different types of aircraft. As of 2021, she is currently the Commanding Officer of 10 Squadron, where she teaches and leads the next generation of aviators. Jovanovich is the second female pilot in RAAF’s history to take command of a flying unit.

Military career 
Jovanovich joined the RAAF in 2001 and studied at UNSW Canberra at the Australian Defence Force Academy (ADFA) between 2001 and 2004. In 2004 she graduated from UNSW with a Bachelor of Science majoring in mathematics and physics, with first class Honours and a University Medal in Physics. Jovanovich underwent flying training on the CT-4B and PC-9/A aircraft and graduated from No 206 Pilots Course in 2006. After graduating from ADFA and pilot training, she flew the P3 Orion on operations and exercises all over the world, including the Middle East, US, Asia, and Southwest Pacific. During operational service she earned her Masters in Systems Engineering in 2013. In 2013, Jovanovich attended the prestigious United States Air Force Test Pilot School, flying 23 types of aircraft over the duration of the course. She was the first Australian in 25 years to complete the course.

On return from the US, Jovanovich worked as a test pilot at the Aircraft Research and Development Unit at RAAF Base Edinburgh. In December 2020 Jovanovich assumed command of No. 10 Squadron, becoming the third woman to lead a RAAF flying squadron. No. 10 Squadron became the first RAAF squadron to simultaneously have a female commanding officer and a female executive officer in 2021 when Squadron Leader Jenna Higgins took up the role. Jovanovich described this as "Both a big deal, and not a big deal. It’s a big deal because we’re breaking new ground, and it’s not a big deal because at 10 Sqn that’s honestly just business as usual. Everybody just accepts that we’re here because we’re awesome at our jobs, and we are. So, we just get on with it".

Awards 

 2019 – Conspicuous Service Medal (CSM) for meritorious achievement and devotion to duty as the initial Commander of Task Element 629.3.1.1 during operation PHILIPPINES ASSIST, supporting the liberation of Marawi.
 2021 – Duke of Gloucester Cup for Most Proficient Flying Unit of 2020.

References 

Living people
Year of birth missing (living people)
Australian women aviators
University of New South Wales alumni